Arkady Filimonovich Veprev (20 October 1927 – 23 July 2006), was a Russian statesman who had served as the Governor (Head) of Krasnoyarsk Krai from 1991 to 1993.

Veprev had also been a people's Deputy of the Soviet Union.

He had been the chairman of the collective farm "Nazarovsky" of the Krasnoyarsk Krai.

He was awarded the title of Hero of Socialist Labour.

Biography

Arkady Veprev was born 29 October 1927 in the village of Varenitsy, to a large peasant family. From the age of fifteen, he began to work as an accountant on a collective farm, the war prevented him from graduating from school. From 1942 to 1944, he worked on the Vorontsovsky collective farm in the Kirov Oblast.

From 1944 to 1952, Veprev served in the army, as he was the a cadet of the Chelyabinsk military aviation school of navigators and gunners-radio operators, and an air gunner-radio operator of long-range aviation.

From 1952 to 1953 he was an apprentice of a borer, a borer of a machine-building plant in Moscow.

In 1958, he graduated from the Moscow Agricultural Academy. During his studies, he was a Stalinist scholarship holder, secretary of the Komsomol organization and a member of the party bureau of the faculty.

From 1958 to 1990, he has an agronomist of the agricultural inspection, chief agronomist, since 1959 - director of the Nazarovsky state farm in the Nazarovsky district of the Krasnoyarsk Krai. This farm was considered one of the best in the USSR. Here they received a stable 30-35 centners of grain per hectare, milk yields approached four and a half thousand liters per cow, and the cost of meat was the cheapest in the country and significantly lower than in England, the Netherlands and Sweden.

By the Decree of the Presidium of the Supreme Soviet of the USSR of 9 June 1984, for achieving outstanding performance and labor heroism, shown in the implementation of plans and socialist obligations to increase the production and sale of grain and other agricultural products to the state in 1983, Veprev was awarded the title of Hero of Socialist Labor with the award Order of Lenin and gold medal "Hammer and Sickle".

As part of the Soviet delegation, Veprev, as an outstanding practitioner of Siberian agriculture, went to speak in the US Senate, after which American senators came to the Krasnoyarsk Krai to the Nazarovsky state farm.

From 1990 to 1991, he was the Chairman of the Committee of the Supreme Soviet of the USSR on Agrarian Issues and Food.

On 29 December 1991, Veprev was appointed the 1st Governor (Head) of the Krasnoyarsk Krai, officially taking office on 31 December.

In mid-1992, a confrontation began between the executive and legislative branches, which ended with the voluntary resignation of Veprev. On 21 January 1993, he resigned "due to health reasons", and on 27 January, by decree of the President of Russia Boris Yeltsin, Vrepev was released from office, and was replaced by Valery Zubov.

In 1993, he was retired and was an adviser-consultant of CJSC Nazarovskoye (the former state farm headed by him).

He lived the rest of his in the village of Stepnoy, Nazarovsky district, where he died on 27 July 2006, as the cause of death was a massive heart attack. He was buried in Stepnoy.

Family

He was married to his wife, Elvira Vepreva.

References

1927 births
2006 deaths
People from Kotelnichsky Uyezd
People from Kirov Oblast
Members of the Supreme Soviet of the Soviet Union
Governors of Krasnoyarsk Krai
Recipients of the Order of Lenin
Heroes of Socialist Labour
20th-century Russian politicians